Mindy Seu (born 1991) is an American designer and researcher whose work focuses on public engagement with digital archives. Seu is currently on the Faculty at Rutgers Mason Gross School of the Arts and also teaches at the Yale School of Art.

Education
Seu graduated from the University of California, Los Angeles with a B.A. in Design Media Arts in 2013 and later graduated from the Harvard Graduate School of Design with an M.Des in 2019.

Career
Between 2013 and 2017, Seu worked at the design studio 2x4 on the Interactive Media team, taught at the California College of the Arts, and published her own archival projects, including the web-based archive of Avant Garde Magazine and a digitization of Emmett Williams' 1968 concrete poem Sweethearts.

From 2017 to 2018, Seu published the web archives for Eros and Fact magazines, completing the digitization of Ralph Ginzburg and Herb Lubalin's iconic publications. Also in 2018, Seu became a fellow at the Internet Archive and Harvard's Berkman Klein Center for the Internet & Society. Starting in 2019, she began work on an archive of cyberfeminism, which later received the Design Studies Thesis Prize from Harvard University Graduate School of Design. Seu's Cyberfeminism Catalog project began as a spreadsheet, a medium she often employs for its legibility and longevity.

Selected works

Sweethearts (2013)
Avant Garde Archive (2014)
Eros Archive (2017)
Fact Archive (2018)
Cyberfeminism Catalog: 1990–2020 (2019–)

References

External links 
 Avant Garde, Eros and Fact Magazine archives
 Cyberfeminist Index

American graphic designers
American women graphic designers
Interface designers
Living people
University of California, Los Angeles alumni
Harvard Graduate School of Design alumni
1991 births
21st-century American women
Women graphic designers